The Marine Strategy Framework Directive (MSFD; full title: Directive 2008/56/EC of the European Parliament and of the Council of 17 June 2008 establishing a framework for community action in the field of marine environmental policy) is a European Directive aimed at achieving or maintaining Good Environmental Status in European seas.

References

European Union directives
Marine conservation
Environmental law in the European Union